Radio Free America may refer to:

 The religious pirate radio station operated by Carl McIntire in 1973; see also Pirate radio in North America#Stations from international waters
 A former name of Dave Emory's talk radio show
 A right-wing political radio show hosted by Tom Valentine in the late 1980s and 1990s, heard originally on the Sun Radio Network but later only on shortwave-station WWCR.
 A fictional radio station featured in the 1984 film Red Dawn and its remake
 A fictional radio station mentioned in The Handmaid's Tale
 A free on-line platform for college radio and community radio
 Radio Free America (album), 2018 album by Richie Sambora and Orianthi

See also
 Radio Free Europe